The Sunrise Centre Station is a bus station and terminal in Kitchener, Ontario, Canada.

The station is a single platform with bus bays on each side. The platform has a heated shelter with seats inside, LED real-time displays and map boards. There is a crosswalk at the northern end of the platform which connects to the shopping centre. Also at the north end is a station pillar which features the name and facilies at the station

History

The Sunrise Centre Station was built as a new station for expanding service in the area. Upon opening it replaced a temporary platform.

Routes

References

External links

Grand River Transit
Bus stations in Kitchener, Ontario